Sir Gilbert Henry Claughton, 1st Baronet (21 February 1856 – 27 June 1921), was an English businessman and politician.

Born in Kidderminster, Worcestershire, England Claughton was the son of the Right Reverend Thomas Legh Claughton, Bishop of St Albans, by the Honourable Julia Susannah Ward, daughter of William Ward, 10th Baron Ward. He was Mayor of Dudley between 1891 and 1894 and one of the original members of the Staffordshire County Council. He was an Alderman of the council between 1895 and 1921. In 1906 he stood unsuccessfully as a Conservative for Dudley. From 1911 to 1921 he served as Chairman of the London and North Western Railway. He was created a baronet, of The Priory in the Parish of Dudley in the County of Worcester, on 4 July 1912. He died in June 1921, aged 65, when the title became extinct.

References

External links
www.Art UK.co.uk Your Paintings: Sir Gilbert Henry Claughton (1856–1921), Bt, by Frank Moss Bennett.
Brief briography at www.steamindex.com

1856 births
1921 deaths
Baronets in the Baronetage of the United Kingdom
Mayors of places in the West Midlands (county)